This is a list of films which placed number one at the weekend box office for the year 2007.

Highest-grossing films

References

 List of Mexican films — Mexican films by year

2007
Mexico
Box